is a self-contained compact color printing system invented in 1977, by Noboru Hayama. Gocco became immensely popular in Japan and it is estimated that one-third of Japanese households own a Print Gocco system. The printing mechanism is that of screen printing. The Gocco sets included the materials and tools to both make the screens, and to use these screens for printing. As the Gocco screens are quite small, they were most widely used for printing greeting cards, a popular need within Japanese culture. Gocco could also print to fabrics, although only across a small area. The Gocco printing screens provided accurate registration, so printing in two or more colours was practical and popular.

The name "print gocco" is derived from the Japanese word , loosely translated as make-believe play. Riso Kagaku president Noboru Hayama explained, "We [as kids] learned rules and knowledge through make-believe play. The spirit of play is an important cultural asset. I thought that I wanted to leave "play" in the product's name."

Printing method 
The Gocco process was a variant of screen printing; the stencils were made through a photocopying process, similar to Thermofax.

The body of the printer was a hinged plastic frame, used both as a press in the printing process, and as a holder for the artwork, screen and the lightbox in the stencil preparation.

The materials included proprietary blank screens, consisting of thin layer of thermoplastic bonded to a mesh, held in a cardboard frame and covered with transparent film.

Screen making 
Artwork was prepared as a simple black and white illustration on paper. This could be done by hand, with ink, paint or pencil, by computer printing (although the original Gocco pre-dated home computer printing), or by arranging pre-printed clip-arts. Solid black (the manufacturer suggested carbon based pigment or soft pencil) illustration gave better results and sharper prints. It was also possible to make photograms, using a natural material such as a leaf as an artwork of found-materials.

The blank screen was then sandwiched on top of the artwork and the Gocco's simple battery-powered lightbox was used to expose the screen. This used flash bulbs similar to those found in old cameras. The dark areas of the artwork would absorb more of the flash energy, the resulting heat would melt away the thermoplastic from the screen mesh. The stencil was immediately ready for use.

Printing 
The ink was applied to the stencil and covered with foil. The stencil and blank paper were placed in the Gocco, pressing down on the printer handle would apply the pressure evenly to the stencil, squeezing the ink through the exposed areas. The required pressure limited the process to fairly small, postcard-sized prints.

Unlike the typical screen printing which uses a squeegee, there was no large movement of ink, and so it was possible to use multiple paint colours at the same time. Foam separators could be used to further limit the colour mixing.

Decline 
In December 2005, Gocco’s parent company, Riso Kagaku Corporation, announced it would end production of the Gocco system due to low sales in Japan. An Internet campaign was started to find a new home for the product.

As of June 2007, Riso Kagaku Corporation had resumed production of several lines of Print Gocco units and they were available in Japan and through limited import retail stores in the United States.

On May 30, 2008, the Riso Kagaku Corporation announced that it would stop shipping Gocco printers in June 2008. It blamed the sharp decline in demand for its printers on the increase in use of home computers and printers. It was to continue producing supplies for the printers.

See also
 Screen printing
 Mimeograph machine

References

External links
 Original Gocco Patent
 
 Riso Gocco Screen Printing Demo

Screen printing
Printmaking
Products introduced in 1977
Japanese inventions